Joy Salinas is a Filipino singer, and a specialist in dance music.

Biography
Joy Salinas started playing the guitar at the age of 14. In the 1980s, she moved to Italy, and in 1987 won an audition for The G.B. Show, and was featured in seven episodes.

In 1989, Salinas recorded her first single, Paris Night, which was successful in France. In the summer of 1991, her single Rockin' Romance, which she sang at the Festivalbar, sold 13,000 copies in the first two weeks after its release in Italy. She placed third in the Festivalbar competition. The song is included in the soundtrack of the film Abbronzatissimi.

In the same year, Salinas released her debut self-titled album, Joy Salinas, which included the song The Mystery of Love. The song was also included in the soundtrack of the film Christmas Holidays '91.

The song 'single Party Time''' was released in 1992 in collaboration with DJ Herbie.

In 1993, Salinas's single Bip Bip and her second album, of the same title, was ranked as the best-selling and most danced-to album, reaching 76th and 86th place, respectively, of the best-selling singles of the year.

In 1994, Salinas recorded the singles Gotta Be Good (by Mario Fargetta) and Calling You Love, a hit of summer 1994, with rapper Kevin Orlando Ettienne.

In 1995, she released Let Me Say I Do.

In 1997, Salinas released the album Dream in Paradise, which included the single Give Me a Break, the soundtrack of the film Panarea.

After a break, Salinas returned in 2013 with an album titled Starlight''.

Discography

Albums
 1991 Joy Salinas
 1993 Bip Bip
 1997 Dream in Paradise
 2013 Starlight

Singles
 1989 - Paris Night
 1991 - Rockin' Romance
 1991 - The Mystery Of Love
 1992 - Stay Tonight
 1993 - Bip Bip
 1993 - People Talk
 1993 - Hands Off (Set Me Free)
 1994 - Gotta Be Good
 1994 - Callin' You Love
 1995 - Let Me Say I Do
 1995 - Deputy Of Love
 1996 - Give Me A Break
 1997 - Dream In Paradise 
 1998 - Calling You
 2003 - I Can't Stop
 2012 - Keeping The Planets
 2013 - Something You Wanted

References

External links

Living people
Year of birth missing (living people)
Eurodance musicians
21st-century Filipino women singers
20th-century Filipino women singers
Filipino expatriates in Italy